Struhařov is a municipality and village in Prague-East District in the Central Bohemian Region of the Czech Republic. It has about 900 inhabitants.

History
The first written mention of Struhařov is from 1397.

Gallery

References

Villages in Prague-East District